Dead Sara is an American hard rock band from Seattle, consisting of Emily Armstrong (lead vocals, rhythm guitar), Siouxsie Medley (lead guitar, backing vocals), and Sean Friday (drums, backing vocals), best known for their single "Weatherman" from their debut eponymous album Dead Sara (2012). Their most recent album Ain't It Tragic was released in September 2021.

History

Formation and early years (2002–2010)
Emily Armstrong and Siouxsie Medley both began as guitarists and singer-songwriters. Armstrong first picked up a guitar at the age of 12, while Medley began practicing from age 9 on a Fender Telecaster owned by her nanny (Dexy Valentine of Magic Wands), before two years' worth of saved allowances allowed Medley to buy her own guitar at age 11. Armstrong performed folk music as a solo artist and as a member of several school bands.

Armstrong and Medley met through a mutual friend in 2002, at ages 16 and 15 respectively. The pair began writing songs together in 2003, and in 2004 completed their first studio recording with the song "Changes". Their first live performance as a band was in March 2005 at The Mint nightclub in Los Angeles, with Armstrong playing bass.

Having briefly gone by the name Epiphany, in mid-2005 they changed their name to Dead Sara as a reference to the Fleetwood Mac song "Sara" and its lyric "...said Sara", which the band misheard as "dead Sara". Both Armstrong and Medley have publicly cited Stevie Nicks, the singer and writer of the song "Sara", as a primary influence. Around this time Medley began styling her first name as "Siouxsie", as a nod to the Sioux Indians tribe and the Native American heritage of one of her great-grandparents (rather than a reference to the musical artist Siouxsie Sioux).

In 2007 Dead Sara began their first tour as the opening act for Endless Hallway. They released the six-song EP The Airport Sessions on Viscount Records in 2008. After numerous changes to the drummer and bass player positions, the band's line-up finally coalesced in 2009 with Sean Friday on drums and Chris Null on bass, both of whom previously played with Sonny Moore (currently known as Skrillex). In 2009 Armstrong was commissioned by Hole frontwoman Courtney Love to sing backing vocals on Love's 2010 album Nobody's Daughter. In 2011, when singer Grace Slick was asked by The Wall Street Journal which contemporary female singers she admires, Slick named Armstrong. In 2010, the band started their own label, Pocket Kid Records, set up as a subsidiary of Interact-TV, Inc. and owned by Armstrong and Medley.

Radio notice and debut album (2011–2013)
Radio stations KYSR-FM, KTBZ-FM, and WCCC are credited with initially breaking Dead Sara on the radio. WCCC's Mike Karolyi was in California at the Sunset Sessions convention where Staind was also premiering their documentary. However, overhearing Dead Sara, he skipped the event and checked them out instead. When he returned to Connecticut he played the band's single "Weatherman", giving the group greater exposure. The song, which had not been officially released, ranked No. 2 on WCCC's Top 69 for the year 2011. In September 2011, the band went on tour with Bush, and in February 2012 the band released "Weatherman" as the lead single for their upcoming debut album.

In April 2012, the band released their debut eponymous album through their label Pocket Kid Records, produced by Noah Shain. The album peaked at No. 16 on Billboard's Heatseekers Albums chart. Soon after, "Weatherman" was used by Fiat in their "Fiat 500 Abarth Burning Up the Desert" advertisement. Dead Sara received the "Best New Rock Group" award at the third annual Vegas Rocks! Magazine Music Awards 2012 on August 26, 2012. They were also nominated for a Radio Contraband Rock Radio Award as Indie Artist of the Year in 2012, and were voted the 98.7 FM 2012 Close to Home Artist of the Year, defeating No Doubt in the final round. "Weatherman" topped the Loudwire "10 Best Rock Songs of 2012" list, beating several major bands including Three Days Grace, Stone Sour, and Deftones. Both Armstrong and Medley were nominated as top ten finalists in the Loudwire 2012 top vocalist and top guitarist awards respectively. Additionally, Armstrong was nominated for the Loudwire 2012 Rock Goddess of the Year award.

After performing spring dates with Chevelle and The Used, the band spent the summer of 2012 touring as part of the Vans Warped Tour in the US. During the 2012 Sunset Strip Music Festival, Emily Armstrong performed "Soul Kitchen" with Robby Krieger and Ray Manzarek of The Doors. In fall 2012, the band toured with The Offspring and Neon Trees, and in February 2013 the band began touring with Muse.

The music video for the song "Lemon Scent", conceived and directed by Reg B., was the band's first scripted video, featuring members of the band fighting each other and audience members in a private boxing match. The video debuted on Rolling Stone's website on March 14, 2013. It was filmed at Serenity West Recording Studio in Los Angeles, California. The extras making up the crowd were fans who volunteered their time after the band posted about the shoot on their official website and Facebook page. Dead Sara signed with Epic Records in 2013.

Label Issues and additional albums (2014–present)
The band went into the studio at the beginning of 2014 to work on their second album, once again with producer Noah Shain. The record did not see the light of day until the following year due to alleged issues with Epic Records. The band and the label parted ways sometime in 2014.

In December 2014, Dead Sara announced that they would be releasing their second album Pleasure to Meet You in March 2015, on their own Pocket Kid Records label. The band also announced they would be using PledgeMusic for those who wanted to pre-order the album. One track, "Suicidal", was given as a free download for contributors to the PledgeMusic campaign. The album's release was followed by a short headlining tour. Bassist Chris Null then left the band.

In 2015, Dead Sara's cover of Nirvana's "Heart-Shaped Box," recorded for Infamous Second Son, won the award for "Best Song, Original or Adapted" at the National Academy of Video Game Trade Reviewers (NAVGTR) annual awards program. In another trailer for Infamous: Second Son, their own song "Weatherman" was also used. Dead Sara signed with Atlantic Records in 2017. The six-song EP Temporary Things Taking Up Space was released on June 8, 2018. In November 2020, the band released the song "Hands Up". Their third full-length album Ain't It Tragic was released on September 17, 2021.

In 2022, the group worked on tracks "Bones" and was featured on "Help Me" from Demi Lovato's eighth studio album Holy Fvck. They also joined the singer's concert tour Holy Fvck Tour supporting the album during the North America leg.

Media appearances
Dead Sara made their debut television appearance on Jimmy Kimmel Live! on June 7, 2012, performing their single "Weatherman" and "Sorry For It All". Dead Sara was featured on FUSE NEWS on March 20, 2013, during which Dave Grohl commented that "Dead Sara should be the next biggest rock band in the world." In addition to countless amounts of appearances and reining rock gods the band tend to be more humble and private living a buddhism lifestyle. Dead Sara appeared on The Vampire Diaries on March 21, 2013, performing the songs "Ask The Angels" by Patti Smith and their own "Lemon Scent". Also in 2013, "Weatherman" was used in Banshee as ending of the second episode of the first season. Dead Sara performed "Something Good" and "Mona Lisa" from their second album Pleasure to Meet You on Late Night with Seth Meyers on April 1, 2015.

Discography

Albums

Extended plays

Singles

References

External links

 Official website
 Official YouTube channel
 Profile at Reverbnation
 Official Pocket Kid Records News about Dead Sara

Hard rock musical groups from California
Musical groups from Los Angeles
Musical groups established in the 2000s